Fabio Cudicini (born 20 October 1935) is an Italian former professional footballer who played as a goalkeeper from 1955 to 1972. Despite never playing for the Italy national football team, he is regarded as one of the best goalkeepers of his generation, and as one of Italy's best ever goalkeepers. Cudicini is mostly remembered for his highly successful and dominant stint with A.C. Milan, and he is one of the most celebrated goalkeepers in the club's history, helping them win the 1969 European Cup Final in particular, among other domestic, European, and international titles.

Club career
Born in Trieste, Cudicini began his professional career with Udinese in 1955, making his debut during the 1955–56 Serie B season, and obtained promotion to Serie A with the club. In his first season in the Italian top division, he collected 13 appearances throughout the season, and marked his Serie A debut with a clean sheet in a 2–0 home win over Palermo on 2 December 1956. In 1958, he joined Roma. After two seasons as the team's back-up goalkeeper behind Luciano Panetti, he was promoted to the team's starting goalkeeper in 1960, and retained the position for the next six seasons, collecting 166 league appearances, and winning the Inter-Cities Fairs Cup in 1960–61 and a Coppa Italia in 1964. He spent the 1966–67 Serie A season with Brescia, helping the club avoid relegation. In 1967, at the age of 32, he joined Milan, where he remained until his retirement in 1972, making 127 league appearances for the club and 183 appearances in all competitions under manager Nereo Rocco; he achieved notable domestic and international success with the club, winning the Serie A title and the Cup Winners' Cup in his first season, followed by the European Cup and the Intercontinental Cup in 1969, and finally the Coppa Italia in 1972. He is Milan's seventh-most capped keeper of all time, behind only Christian Abbiati (380), Sebastiano Rossi (330), Dida (302), Lorenzo Buffon (300), Enrico Albertosi (233), and Dario Compiani (221).

International career
Despite his reputation and club achievements, Cudicini never played for the Italian senior national team, mainly because of the contemporary presence of several other notable players in his role throughout his career, such as Lorenzo Buffon, Giorgio Ghezzi, Dino Zoff, and Enrico Albertosi. He represented Italy at youth level, however, and during his time with Roma, he was called up to the Italy B team on 8 May 1963; although he never played for the Italy senior team, he was called-up on several occasions, in particular as a back-up to Zoff during Italy's qualifying campaign for the 1970 FIFA World Cup.

Style of play

A spectacular goalkeeper, who is regarded as one of the best goalkeepers of his generation, and as one of Italy's and Milan's greatest ever goalkeepers, Cudicini was known for his agility, reactions, and shot-stopping ability as a goalkeeper, as well as his large reach, and his tall, slender build and long limbs, which aided him in coming off his line to collect crosses, but also occasionally limited his speed and mobility at times. Although he often stood out throughout his career for his athleticism in goal and ability to produce acrobatic dives and decisive saves, he was also known to be an extremely efficient rather than flamboyant goalkeeper, who possessed an excellent positional sense. A precocious talent in his youth, Cudicini also stood out for his consistency and longevity throughout his career, and had a highly successful spell with Milan even in his later years; despite his ability, however, he often struggled with injuries throughout his career. Cudicini frequently wore all-black goalkeeping attire, which along with his long limbs and goalkeeping abilities, earned him the nickname Il Ragno Nero ('The Black Spider'), a nickname which also belonged to legendary Soviet goalkeeper Lev Yashin, who was also known for wearing all-black goalkeeping attire. Before becoming a goalkeeper, Cudicini initially played as a right winger in his youth.

Personal life
Fabio Cudicini is the father of former Chelsea, Tottenham, and Los Angeles Galaxy goalkeeper Carlo Cudicini. He is also the son of ex Ponziana Trieste defender Guglielmo Cudicini (deceased).

Honours

Club
Roma
Coppa Italia: 1963–64
Inter-Cities Fairs Cup: 1960–61

Milan
Serie A: 1967–68
Coppa Italia: 1971–72
European Cup: 1968–69
European Cup Winners' Cup: 1967–68
Intercontinental Cup: 1969

Individual
A.C. Milan Hall of Fame

References

External links
 A.C. Milan Hall of Fame entry
 A Cudicini's biography
Entry on Fabio Cudicini

Italian footballers
Serie A players
Serie B players
A.C. Milan players
Udinese Calcio players
A.S. Roma players
Brescia Calcio players
Association football goalkeepers
1935 births
Living people
Footballers from Trieste
UEFA Champions League winning players